Miss Europe 2006, was the 58th edition of the Miss Europe pageant and the third and final edition under Endemol France. After this years contest, the pageant was planned for 2007, 2008 & 2009 with it being held in places in Moscow and Beirut. The contest, however, was not held after 2006 and Endemol France stopped the pageant after this edition. The Miss Europe pageant went unheld until 2016 when the newly formed Miss Europe Organization started the pageant back up. This years pageant was held in Kyiv, Ukraine on October 27, 2006. Alexandra Rosenfeld of France, was crowned Miss Europe 2006 by outgoing titleholder Shermine Shahrivar of Germany.

Results

Placements

Order of announcements 
Top 12

1. Finland
2. Moldova
3. Norway
4. Armenia
5. Switzerland
6. Belgium

7. France
8. Spain
9. Belarus
10. Poland
11. Ukraine
12. Germany

Top 5
1. France
2. Poland
3. Ukraine
4. Spain
5. Belarus

Judges 
 Roberto Cavalli
 Charles-Philippe D'orleans
 Adriana Karembeu
 Anthony Delon
  Alexandre Zouari
 Caroline Gruosi-Scheufele

Contestants 

 - Suada Bilbil Sherifi
 - Marina Vardanyan
 - Cathrin Czizek
 - Yuliya Sindzeyeva
 - Kaat Vermeeren
 - Valentina Jurkovic
 - Ralitsa Bratovanova
 - Konstantina Kristodoulou
 - Daniela Frantzová
 - Sandra Vester
 - Jana Kuvaitseva
 - Sini Vahela
 - Alexandra Rosenfeld
 - Tatia Aprasidze
 - Daniela Domröse
 - Eleanor Mary Ann Glynn
 - Olympia Hopsonidou
 - Tunde Semmi-Kis
 - Asdís Svava Hallgrímsdóttir
 -  Sefora Micallef
 - Yekaterina Vigovskaya
 - Maja Perovic
 - Florencia Mulder
 - Karoline Nakken
 - Katarzyna Weronika Borowicz
 - Irina Cucireve
 - Ana Sain
 - Katarina Holanova
 - Laura Ojeda Ramírez
 - Cecilia Zatterl Harbo Kristensen
 - Sabine Christina Heierli
 - Selda Ögrük
 - Alena Avramenko

References

External links 
 

Miss Europe
2006 in Europe
2006 beauty pageants
2006 in Ukraine
2000s in Kyiv
Events in Kyiv
October 2006 events in Ukraine